

Carlos Salazar Lomelín (born April 1951) is a Mexican businessman who serves as chief executive officer of Coca-Cola FEMSA since 1 January 2000.

Early life
Salazar graduated with a bachelor's degree in Economics (1973) and an MBA (1989) from the Monterrey Institute of Technology (ITESM).  He also undertook executive courses in Business Administration and Economic Development at Instituto di Studi per lo Sviluppo Economico in Naples, and at IPADE, in Mexico City.

Career
During his studies in Italy he interned at Cassa di Risparmio delle Provincie Lombarde.

Salazar joined Femsa in 1973 and rose through the ranks as director-general of Grafo Regia, commercial planning officer of Femsa and chief executive officer of Femsa Cerveza. On 1 January 2000 he was appointed chief executive officer of Coca-Cola Femsa.

Aside from his business activities, Salazar has lectured in Economics at the Monterrey Institute of Technology, where he also served as president of the corporate advisory board of EGADE Business School (2009-2010).

In June 2011 it was rumored that he would succeed Rafael Rangel Sostmann as rector of that university.

References 

Living people
1951 births
Mexican chief executives
Monterrey Institute of Technology and Higher Education alumni
Academic staff of the Monterrey Institute of Technology and Higher Education